Glenwood High School, also known as Old Glenwood School, is a historic school in Glenwood, Georgia that has been used in recent years as an alternative school. It is located at 505 3rd Avenue.

It was constructed as a one-story school building in 1920 and expanded with a two-story addition in 1930 and 1933, and an auditorium was added in 1951. It includes aspects of the Colonial Revival, Craftsman, bungalow, and Spanish  Mission Revival architectural styles. In 1996 a Georgia Heritage Grant was awarded to repair the school's windows.  It was added to the National Register of Historic Places in 1997.  As of 2017, it houses the Transitional Alternative Prep School.

The front entrance has a Spanish Colonial Revival-style parapet.

See also
National Register of Historic Places listings in Wheeler County, Georgia
Wheeler County School District

References

External links
 
Photo of school

National Register of Historic Places in Wheeler County, Georgia
Buildings and structures in Wheeler County, Georgia
Education in Wheeler County, Georgia
School buildings on the National Register of Historic Places in Georgia (U.S. state)